Magick Brother is the debut studio album by the progressive rock band Gong, recorded in Paris during September and October 1969 and released in March 1970 on the French BYG Actuel label.

The band's recently recruited bass player Christian Tritsch was not ready in time to play on the album, and so singer/songwriter/guitarist Daevid Allen played the bass guitar himself; a photo of Allen recording bass tracks for the album is featured on the cover artwork. They also made use of jazz contrabass (double bass) players Earl Freeman and Barre Phillips, who were recording for the label at the same time, on three tracks. Occasional early Gong collaborator Dieter Gewissler, who normally played violin, also contributed some "free" bowed contrabass to two tracks. The LP sleeves were printed before the final track order and titles had been decided and so the songs "Rational Anthem" (AKA "Change the World") and "Glad To Sad To Say" were listed the wrong way round.

Shortly afterwards, the band played its debut gig at the BYG Actuel Festival in the small town of Amougies, Belgium, on 27 October 1969, introduced to the stage by bemused compere Frank Zappa.

Track listing

All songs written by Daevid Allen, though credited to his partner Gilli Smyth for legal reasons.

Produced by Jean Georgakarakos and Jean Luc Young.

The version on CD has a different tracks grouping and lengths:

Credits
Gong
 Daevid Allen –  guitar, bass guitar, vocals
 Gilli Smyth –  space whisper
 Didier Malherbe –  flute, soprano saxophone
 Rachid Houari – drums, percussion

Additional personnel
 Barre Phillips –  contrabass on 4 & 10
 Earl Freeman –  contrabass on 8, piano on 9
 Burton Greene –  piano on 8
 Dieter Gewissler –  bowed contrabass on 2 & 9
 Tasmin Smyth (Gilli's daughter) –  voices on 1 & 10

References

1970 debut albums
Gong (band) albums
Charly Records albums
Psychedelic rock albums by British artists